Dando as a surname can refer to the following people:
Bill Dando (1932-2022), American football coach and player
Carolyn Dando, New Zealand actress and soprano
Evan Dando, American musician and member of the band The Lemonheads
Jill Dando (1961-1999), British television presenter and murder victim
Joseph Dando (1806–1894), British violinist
Maurice Dando, English football (soccer) player
Shigemitsu Dandō, Japanese criminology expert
Suzanne Dando, British gymnast
Dando the Tribesmen